Appalavandla palli is a village in Sri Sathya Sai district of the Indian state of Andhra Pradesh. It is the headquarters of Kothacheruvu mandal in Kadiri revenue division. Also very reachable to Penukonda, Puttaparthi, Dharmavaram, Kothacheruvu, Hindupur and Bangalore

References 

Villages in Anantapur district